Major-General Hon. Percy Gerald Scarlett  (10 April 1885 – 5 October 1957) was a senior British Army officer.

Early life
Scarlett was the son of Lieutenant-Colonel Leopold James Yorke Campbell Scarlett and Bessie Florence Gibson, and the great-grandson of James Scarlett, 1st Baron Abinger. He was educated at Wellington College, Berkshire. Three of his brothers succeeded to the Abinger Barony, and in 1904 Scarlett was granted the style and precedence of the younger son of a baron by Royal Warrant.

Military career
He attended the Royal Military College, Sandhurst and was commissioned into the Buffs (Royal East Kent Regiment) in 1907. He fought in the First World War, during which he was Mentioned in Dispatches. He was awarded the Military Cross.

After graduating from the Staff College, Camberley in 1921, he was promoted to brevet lieutenant-colonel he was in the service of the Shanghai Defence Force from 1927 to 1928. Promoted to brigadier, he served as commander of the 12th Infantry Brigade and Deputy Constable of Dover Castle between 1936 and 1938. Promoted to major-general he was General Officer Commanding the Deccan District in India in 1938. He saw service in the Second World War and was General Officer Commanding the Indian 4th Infantry Division from 1939 to 1940. He became Director of Mobilization in 1940 and was Deputy Adjutant-General between 1940 and 1942. Scarlett was appointed a Companion of the Order of the Bath in 1941 and held the office of Deputy Lieutenant of Kent in 1949. Between 1943 and 1953 he was the Colonel of the Buffs. He was appointed a Knight Grand Cross of the Order of the Dannebrog in 1952.

Marriage
He married Margaret Macdonald Humphreys, daughter of Thomas Humphreys, on 21 November 1928. They had no children.

References

Bibliography

External links
Generals of World War II

1885 births
1957 deaths
Graduates of the Staff College, Camberley
Companions of the Order of the Bath
Recipients of the Military Cross
People educated at Wellington College, Berkshire
Graduates of the Royal Military College, Sandhurst
Buffs (Royal East Kent Regiment) officers
British Army generals of World War II
Deputy Lieutenants of Kent
British Army personnel of World War I